Cariduros de Fajardo is a professional basketball team of the Baloncesto Superior Nacional founded in 1973. Based in  Fajardo, Puerto Rico, the team plays at the Tomás Dones Coliseum.

History

The team was founded in 1973 and participated in the Baloncesto Superior Nacional before folding in 1998 do to financial issues that maded impossible to run the franchise. The original franchise featured BSN legends such as Georgie Torres, Edgar León, Wilson Oquendo, Oscar Fuentes, Daniel Vasallo, and also served as the first steps for legendary coach Julio Toro. The team played at the Evaristo Aponte Sanabria court, before moving to the Tomas Dones Coliseum in 1992. Their best season was precisely that same year, when they reached the Semi-Finals for the first time in franchise history, only to be swept by the eventual finals runner-up, Capitanes de Arecibo. In 1996, Fajardo added rookie Carlos Arroyo to the roster and the fans took notice immediately. With moves not seen by anyone in the BSN, Arroyo took the league by storm. Unfortunately, Arroyo was later traded to Santurce, sealing Fajardo's fate as a franchise in the BSN. The team never recovered and folded in 1998.

In 2007, the Titanes of Morovis and their owner Marcelino Garcia, relocated to Fajardo where the team came to be known as the "Nietos de Marcelino". This team took advantage of the new rule that came in place for the 2007 ROOKIE DRAFT, where grandsons of puerto ricans could enter the draft. Fajardo drafted Javier Mojica, Jesse Pellot-Rosa, and Kevin Hamilton, who also brought his friend Uka Agbai to play as the import player (refuerzo). With a team of rookies and an unknown foreigner, the team finished in 1st place during the regular season, and then went on to lose against the eventual 2007 champions Cangrejeros de Santurce in the Semi-Finals. The following season the team fell apart when financial issues became an issue again. The team went into recession, but lost the franchise after 3 years of inactivity. Javier Mojica went in to win a championship with Bayamón, Kevin Hamilton won the championship with Mayagüez, and Jesse Pellot-Rosa became league MVP with San Germán, leaving all the fans in Fajardo to wonder what could've been if that trio would've stayed together in Fajardo.

On January 14, 2017 the team was refounded and returned to the league for the 2017 season with the purchase of the Atenienses de Manatí franchise by former NBA player Carlos Arroyo and later relocation to his hometown in Fajardo, Puerto Rico.

In May 2021 the team was sold and converted in the  Gigantes de Carolina. The following month, the Santeros de Aguada were relocated to Fajardo. They will play as the Cariduros, with the Aguada roster intact. The move was due to issues with the air conditioning of their home court of Aguada.

Home arenas 

 Evaristo Aponte Sanabria Coliseum (1973–1992)
 Tomás Dones Coliseum (1993–2020)

Current roster

Depth chart

References

External links
 Baloncesto Superior Nacional website 

Baloncesto Superior Nacional
Basketball teams established in 1973
1973 establishments in Puerto Rico